Carmacks is a village in Yukon, Canada, on the Yukon River along the Klondike Highway, and at the west end of the Robert Campbell Highway from Watson Lake. The population is 493 (Canada Census, 2016). It is the home of the Little Salmon/Carmacks First Nation, a Northern Tutchone-speaking people.

History 

The name of the community comes from George Washington Carmack who found coal near Tantalus Butte (locally called Coal Mine Hill) in the early 1890s. He built a trading post near the present site of Carmacks and traded with locals before opening a coal mine in the south bank of the Yukon River. The focus of his entrepreneurial energy switched a few years later when he or his wife, Kate Carmack, discovered gold with her brother, Keish (Skookum Jim), and Dawson Charlie (Tagish Charlie) at what was to become the Discovery Claim, near Dawson City, which started the Klondike Gold Rush. Carmacks incorporated as a village on November 1, 1984.

Geography 
The community consists of the Village of Carmacks and the Little Salmon/Carmacks First Nation. Carmacks Landing Settlement is within the Village of Carmacks.

It is the site of one of the four bridges over the Yukon River. The Campbell Highway also intersects the community and carries on to Faro, Ross River and Watson Lake, providing a gateway to the Canol Road and some of Yukon's most spectacular scenery.

Climate 
Carmacks has a subarctic climate (Dfc) with short but mild summers and long, severely cold winters.

Demographics 

Carmacks has a 91.4% First Nations population the majority of which belong to the Little Salmon Carmacks First Nations.  The local language of the LSCFN community is Northern Tuchone, which is carried on both by the elders and taught to all students at the local Tantalus Elementary/high School.

Economy 
The area around Carmacks has abundant mineral resources, including coal, copper, and gold. Various mining activities are taking place on mineral sites around Carmacks. There is a small zinc-copper mine in production near Carmacks operated by Western Silver and a gold property northwest of Carmacks currently in the exploration stage operated by Northern Freegold Resources based out of Whitehorse.

Attractions 
The Carmacks Recreation Centre is at the east end of River Drive between the nursing station and visitor centre, and is a community focal point for youth. There is a youth drop in daily with a computer access, video games, table games and other activities, often funded by Yukon grant programs. The gymnasium is host to adult floor hockey and other sports. The Recreation Centre also holds a three lane curling rink, fully loaded fitness gym and a full kitchen for all occasions.

Carmacks also has an indoor swimming pool that is open to the community from June to September.

Infrastructure 

Carmacks is served by Klondike Highway by cars and Carmacks Airport by air.

Sports

Every February, Carmacks hosts a checkpoint for both the long-distance Yukon Quest sled dog race and the Yukon Arctic Ultra foot/ski/bike race.

See also
 List of municipalities in Yukon

References

External links

Northern Tutchone
Villages in Yukon
Yukon River